Chlorothecium is a genus of algae belonging to the family Characiopsidaceae.

Selected species:

Chlorothecium africanum 
Chlorothecium capitatum 
Chlorothecium cepa

References

Xanthophyceae
Heterokont genera